Ghetto Therapy is the first collaborative album by American rappers Sen Dog and Mellow Man Ace as the Reyes Brothers, released on June 13, 2006 via Latin Thugs Entertainment LLC.

Background
The seventeen-track record features guest appearances by the likes of Cypress Hill, Warren G, Snoop Dogg, Bishop Lamont, Bishop Don Juan Magic, Slip Malota, Pop Duke, O. Brown, J Killa, Frank Lee White.

Track listing

Technical personnel
Brian "Big Bass" Gardner – mastering
Brian Warfield – recording
Bronek Wroblewski – drum programming
Dave Aron – mixing, recording
Estevan Oriol – design, layout, photography
Fred Sherman – executive producer
Gregg "The Wave Doctor" Sartiano – mixing
Louis Freese – recording
Lucky (of Soul Assassins Studio) – design, layout
Mark Machado – design, layout
Marvin "Big Marv" Sheleby – executive producer
Roberto Jimenez – producer

References

2006 albums
Sen Dog albums
Mellow Man Ace albums
Albums produced by Fredwreck
Albums produced by Scoop DeVille
Albums produced by Warren G
Albums produced by DJ Muggs